Sanford Kwinter is a Canadian-born, New York-based writer and architectural theorist, and a co-founder of Zone Books publishers. Kwinter currently serves as Professor of Theory and Criticism at the Pratt Institute. He formerly served as an associate professor at Rice University in Houston, Texas, and has also taught at MIT, Columbia University and Cornell University and Rensselaer Polytechnic Institute and at Harvard University Graduate School of Design.

Having received a doctorate in comparative literature from Columbia University, Kwinter lectured at Harvard University, the University of Applied Arts Vienna (Universität für angewandte Kunst Wien), the Berlage Institute in Rotterdam, the Architectural Association in London and the Städelschule in Frankfurt. Over the past twenty years, his publications have pioneered new ideas in art, architecture, science and the humanities. He has written widely on philosophical issues related to design, architecture, and urbanism, and was involved in the series of conferences and publications convened by ANY magazine between 1991 and 2000.

Books 
 ZONE 1/2: The Contemporary City (1986) MIT Press.
 ZONE 6: Incorporations (1992) MIT Press.
 Architectures of Time: Toward a Theory of the Event in Modernist Culture (2001) MIT Press. 
 Far from Equilibrium: Essays on Technology and Design Culture (2008) Actar Press. 
 Requiem: For the City at the End of the Millennium (2010) Actar Press.

References

External links

Städelschule Architecture Class Faculty 2008
The archives for Zone Books are held at Columbia University. Rare Book & Manuscript Library.

American architecture writers
American male non-fiction writers
Architectural theoreticians
Columbia Graduate School of Arts and Sciences alumni
Cornell University faculty
Harvard Graduate School of Design faculty
Massachusetts Institute of Technology faculty
Rice University faculty
Living people
Year of birth missing (living people)